Tim Kimsey is a multi-platinum mixing engineer and audio engineer.

Grammy Award Nomination
Kimsey was nominated, alongside fellow engineers Gerald Baillergeau, Chris Bell, Kevin Bond, "Bassy" Bob Brockmann, Mick Guzauski, Fred Hammond, Ray Hammond, Victor “Vinno” Merritt and Mark Williams, for Grammy Award for Best Engineered Album, Non-Classical for Kirk Franklin's 1998 Best Contemporary R&B Gospel Album, The Nu Nation Project.

Selected Discography

References

External links
 Tim Kimsey on Discogs
 Tim Kimsey's Website

Year of birth missing (living people)
Living people